Ivan Semyonovich Kulikov (Russian: Иван Семёнович Куликов; 13 April 1875 in Murom – 15 December 1941 in Murom) was a Russian painter, primarily of portraits  and genre scenes.

Biography 
He was born to a peasant family that had recently moved to Murom from a rural village. His father was a roofer and house painter who headed a small cooperative that built and repaired numerous structures there.

In 1893, a local teacher became impressed with his drawing skills an introduced him to Alexander Morozov, who spent the summers painting in Murom. Morozov was impressed as well and advised his parents to enroll him in the drawing school at the Imperial Society for the Encouragement of the Arts.

He departed later that year, stopping in Moscow on the way to visit the Tretyakov Gallery and the Rumyantsev Museum.

When he arrived in Saint Petersburg, he took a position as an assistant in Morozov's studio. The following year, he enrolled at the drawing school, where his instructors included  Aleksey Afanas'ev and Ernst Liphart. In 1896, he began auditing classes at the Imperial Academy of Arts; briefly with Vladimir Makovsky, then with Ilya Repin. In 1898, upon Repin's recommendation, he became a regular student there.

From 1901 to 1902, he and Boris Kustodiev helped Repin paint his monumental work (app.13 x 29 feet) "Ceremonial Sitting of the State Council on 7 May 1901 Marking the Centenary of its Foundation" for the Mariinsky Palace; providing sketches for most of the portraits. During that same period, he created illustrations for Twenty-six Men and a Girl and Konovalov, both by Maxim Gorky.

He graduated from the Academy in 1902 with a gold medal, the title of "Free Artist" and a stipend to study abroad. From 1903 to 1905, he used that stipend to visit Italy and France. When he returned, he won awards at several exhibitions, was offered employment as Director of the Kharkov art school in 1912 (although the offer was ultimately rejected) and was named an "Academician" in 1915.

In 1919, he helped to establish the "" and headed the art department for many years. In that capacity, he worked vigorously to collect, not only art objects, but documents, books and various historical relics from buildings that were abandoned or due to be demolished; as well as items that were looted during the war. Among the most notable things he saved was a collection of paleolithic objects gathered by Aleksey Uvarov and left at his estate near Murom.

In 1932, he became a member of the Gorky branch of the USSR Union of Artists. In his later years, he created numerous canvases and drawings on military subjects. In 1947, following his wishes, his family opened a museum at his home. It was in operation until 2007, when the local authorities closed it and transferred the collection to the History and Art Museum.

Selected paintings

References

Further reading 
 Nikolai Bespalov, И. С. Куликов: Монография, Изобразительное искусство, 1990 .
 Nikolai Bespalov, Иван Куликов: Альбом, Белый город, 2003 .

External links 
 
Art Gallery:Ivan Semyonovich Kulikov @ Live Journal
"The Ceremonial Meeting of the State Council May 7, 1901" @ Wikimedia Commons

1875 births
1941 deaths
20th-century Russian painters
Russian male painters
Russian genre painters
Russian portrait painters
People from Murom
Directors of museums in Russia
Russian illustrators
20th-century Russian male artists